Nadja Kälin (born 20 April 2001) is a Swiss cross-country skier. She competed in the  Women's 10 kilometre classical, and Women's 15 kilometre skiathlon, at the 2022 Winter Olympics. She competed in the 2021–22 FIS Cross-Country World Cup.

Cross-country skiing results
All results are sourced from the International Ski Federation (FIS).

Olympic Games

World Championships

World Cup

Season standings

References

External links

2001 births
Living people
Swiss female cross-country skiers
Cross-country skiers at the 2022 Winter Olympics
Olympic cross-country skiers of Switzerland
21st-century Swiss women